Chrysiptera rollandi, commonly known as Rolland's demoiselle, is a species of damselfish in the family Pomacentridae.

Distribution
Rolland's demoiselle is widespread throughout the tropical waters of the central Indo-Pacific region. It lives on reefs among corals and in lagoons and harbors.

Description
The Rolland's demoiselle is a small size fish and can reach a maximum size of 7.5 cm in length.
It is dark brown with blue streaks and a cream-colored belly.

It is of some commercial importance in the aquarium trade.

In aquarium
It is not very aggressive in attempting to extend territory but strongly territorial in protecting its ownership of area. If it feels any stress in the aquarium, its health deteriorates rapidly and may die next morning. Therefore, it is quite difficult to raise in aquarium for years.

References

External links
http://www.marinespecies.org/aphia.php?p=taxdetails&id=276840
 

rollandi
Taxa named by Gilbert Percy Whitley
Fish described in 1961